Justinia is a genus of skippers in the family Hesperiidae.

Species
Recognised species in the genus Justinia include:
 Justinia justinianus (Latreille, [1824])

Former species
Justinia gertschi (Bell, 1937) - transferred to Rhomba gertschi (Bell, 1937)
Justinia kora (Hewitson, 1877) - transferred to Koria kora (Hewitson, 1877)

References

Natural History Museum Lepidoptera genus database

Hesperiinae
Hesperiidae genera